Vraneš is a surname. Notable people with the surname include:

Slavko Vraneš (born 1983), Montenegrin professional basketball player
Zoran Vraneš (born 1950), Serbian former football player and coach

See also
Lower Kolašin
Vranješ
Vranešić